Rebecca Jane Grosvenor Taylor known professionally as Riva Taylor is an English singer, songwriter and performer.

Career
The Riva Taylor era began in 2014 when Taylor featured as a guest artist on the Video Games Live World Tour, performing her song from Assassin's Creed and Grammy nominated music from Journey. Some venues included the Eventim Apollo, London and the Heineken Music Hall, Amsterdam. Taylor also opened the Bafta Game Awards where she performed and presented the award for music with film composer David Arnold.    
 
In 2017. Taylor released a club remix of her song Deeper Than Us which charted at number #3 in the Music Week pop charts and was championed by Pete Tong on BBC Radio 1 and Tiesto on his Club Life

In 2018. she released a single titled 'My Mouth' which was selected by Sir Elton John for his Beats1 show Rocket Hour.

In 2020. she released an album titled 'This Woman's Heart .1', featuring the singles 'This Woman's Heart', 'Jealous' and 'Running at Walls'. She showcased the songs at British Summer Time where she supported Barbra Streisand.

Taylor helped found the Songwriters' Circle in 2019, held at Roundhouse, London with Nashville songwriter Jeff Cohen. Later rebranded The Online Songwriters' Circle during the pandemic.

Early life and education
Taylor was born in Hammersmith, London. She had her first experience on the stage at the age of seven in London's West End, playing Little Eponine at the Palace Theatre. Other early achievements include winning the Thorndike Talent competition for ages 8–24, and winning a British Arts Award for her dance performance of the Secret Garden, both of which she achieved at the age of 8.  She also appeared on Blue Peter, performing "My Heart Will Go On" at the age of 10. She attended Danes Hill School, Surrey before studying for her GCSEs and A Levels at Tormead School, Guildford. Taylor has said that living the life of a normal school girl was important for somebody exposed to the music industry from such a young age.

At the age of 12, she landed a recording contract with EMI, making her the youngest artist to have ever been signed to the record label. Her debut album, A Dream Come True (2001) recorded at Abbey Road Studios enjoyed international success. That same year she sang at the Farm Aid benefit gala concert at the Royal Albert Hall. This was attended by Prince Charles who praised the young Taylor and stated he would watch her career with great interest.  She also caught the attention of Mohammed Al Fayed who, after hearing her sing at her album launch at Harrods, invited her to open the Harrods Sale with Jean-Claude Van Damme and Salma Hayek.

Over these years, Taylor toured worldwide promoting her music.  Her US tour was supported by promotional performances on Live With Regis and Kelly hosted by guest presenter Usher and the MDA Labor Day Telethon, Los Angeles. Taylor has performed at the FA Cup Final and at the Six Nations, Twickenham Stadium.

She dances to an advanced standard and has achieved her Associate of the Royal Academy of Dance diploma.

Taylor has graduated from the University of Durham after undertaking a three-year degree in History.

TV, film and video games
Taylor has performed the theme tunes for a number of films and television programmes including BBC Christmas feature film Second Star to the Left starring Barbara Windsor and Hugh Laurie, — Riva performed the song You Can Be A Hero — and Barbie as Rapunzel.

Albums

As Riva Taylor

| This Woman's Heart .1
 Released: 2020

Singles

As Riva Taylor

References

External links
 Official website
 Becky Taylor on AllMusic

1988 births
Living people
People educated at Tormead School
English women singers
English child singers
People from Hammersmith
21st-century English women singers
21st-century English singers
Alumni of Durham University